Weldiya or Woldia is a town, woreda, and capital of the North Wollo Zone in northern Ethiopia. Located north of Dessie and southeast of Lalibela in the Amhara Region, this town has an elevation of 2112 meters above sea level.

A notable landmark is a church Weldiya Gebriel.

History

19th century 
When the missionary Johann Ludwig Krapf passed through Weldiya in April 1842, it was the headquarters of Dejazmach Faris Aligas and his brother Birru. They were absent at the time of Krapf's visit, raiding the territories of Imam Liban of the Were Himano.

As early as 1890, Weldiya was the administrative center of Yejju Province. Its Tuesday market was well known for its mules.

20th century 
Weldiya was attacked in 1948 by farmers who were disgruntled after their appeals over their loss of land were ignored. They seized the prison in Weldiya and freed the prisoners. Despite this success, the revolt was eventually put down. On 16–17 November 1988 Weldiya was subjected to an aerial attack by the Derg, but no deaths were reported.

21st century 

TPLF aligned fighters captured Weldiya on 11 August 2021, but it was recaptured in December 2021.

Demographics
Based on the 2007 national census conducted by the Central Statistical Agency of Ethiopia (CSA), this town had a total population of 46,139, of whom 23,000 were male and 23,139 female. The majority of the inhabitants practiced Ethiopian Orthodox Christianity, with 80.49% reporting that as their religion, while 18.46% of the population said they were Muslim.

The 1994 national census reported a total population for Weldiya of 24,533 in 5,413 households, of whom 11,689 were male and 12,844 were female. The two largest ethnic groups reported in this were the Amhara (93.92%), and the Tigrayan (4.32%); all other ethnic groups made up 1.76% of the population. Amharic was spoken as a first language by 95.2%, and 3.75% spoke Tigrinya; the remaining 1.05% spoke all other primary languages reported. 79.75% of the population practiced Ethiopian Orthodox Christianity, and 19.44% of the population said they were Muslim.

Education 
There is a rising university, Weldiya University, and about a dozen other governmental and private primary and secondary schools.

Economy 
Travertine for use in building has been worked on a minor scale nearby.

Transportation 
Woldia is connected by all weather roads to Addis Ababa and Mekelle by highway 2 and to Debre Tabor by highway 22.

The city will be served by two railways under construction: the Weldiya–Mekelle Railway and the Awash-Woldia Railway.

Notes 

Districts of Amhara Region
Ethiopia
Cities and towns in Ethiopia